Gavin Rose (born 29 September 1969) is a former Australian rules footballer who played with the Sydney Swans in the Australian Football League (AFL).

Rose was drafted initially by Collingwood, with the 38th selection of the 1989 National Draft. He didn't manage to break into the seniors during his time at the club and was traded to Sydney.

At the Swans he was used early on as a defender but developed into a ruckman. He was Sydney's leading ruckman in 1994 and 1995, topping the hit-outs in both years.
 
After leaving Sydney, Rose returned to East Perth, his original club.

References

1969 births
Australian rules footballers from Western Australia
Sydney Swans players
East Perth Football Club players
Living people